Fred Durhal Jr. (born 1951) is an American politician who served as a member of the Michigan House of Representatives.

Durhal was born in Rochester, New York and moved to Detroit in 1952. He graduated from Detroit's Northwestern High School and then attended Wayne State University, Wayne County Community College District and the University of Phoenix.

References

External links 
bio of Durhal

Living people
1951 births
Democratic Party members of the Michigan House of Representatives
African-American state legislators in Michigan
21st-century American politicians
21st-century African-American politicians
20th-century African-American people